Serhiy Solovyov (born 7 March 1971 in Dnipropetrovsk) is a Ukrainian football coach and a former defender. Since July 2021 he serves as a sports director at the Ukrainian club FC Peremoha Dnipro.

Serhiy Solovyov is a product of couple of sports schools associated with FC Dnipro and his first coach was Igor Vetrogonov. Solovyov never played for the first team of FC Dnipro competing only for reserves and in 1991 left it. After he played mostly for several second-tier clubs in Ukraine and Russia.

Sometime after 2001 Solovyov ended playing career and at least since 2006 was coaching. In 2008 to 2012 he led Kryvbas reserves in the UPL reserve competitions. Later he coached several amateur clubs. In 2019 it was a real breakthrough when coaching VPK-Ahro from small town of Mahdalynivka he became a head coach of the Second League group champions gaining promotion to the First League.

References

External links

1971 births
Living people
Footballers from Dnipro
Soviet footballers
Ukrainian footballers
Ukrainian football managers
Ukrainian expatriate footballers
FC Temp Shepetivka players
FC Kryvbas Kryvyi Rih players
FC Krystal Kherson players
MFC Mykolaiv players
FC Sokol Saratov players
FC Yugra Nizhnevartovsk players
Regar-TadAZ Tursunzoda players
Bnei Sakhnin F.C. players
Expatriate footballers in Russia
Expatriate footballers in Tajikistan
Expatriate footballers in Israel
Ukrainian expatriate sportspeople in Israel
Ukrainian Premier League players
FC VPK-Ahro Shevchenkivka managers
Association football defenders